The 2019 New York Mets season was the franchise's 58th season and the team's 11th season at Citi Field. Despite improving on their 77–85 campaign from last year by 9 games with an 86–76 record, they were three games behind the Milwaukee Brewers for a wild card spot and thus missed the playoffs for the third consecutive season. Their division rival, the Washington Nationals, went on to win the World Series.

Spring training
The Mets had a decent spring training with a record of 13–13–2, having equal wins and losses with two ties.

Regular season

March
The Mets began the regular season on March 28, 2019, facing the Washington Nationals away at their home opener, winning 2–0. They won the next game and finished the last game with a loss, taking 2 out of 3.

April
The Mets started the month strong
by sweeping the Miami Marlins in three games. However, the rest of the month proved to be a rollercoaster of wins and losses with division rivals the Washington Nationals and the Philadelphia Phillies. Along with splitting the series (2–2) with the Atlanta Braves. Pete Alonso took home Rookie of the Month honors, as he hit nine home runs, drove in 26 runs, and finished the month with a .291 batting average.

May
The Mets started the month of May off slowly, losing 5 of their first 6. However, that one win was an impressive one, with Noah Syndergaard throwing a 1–0 shutout against the Reds, with a Syndergaard home run being the only run of the game. The Mets continued their slumping May, culminating in being swept in three games by the lowly Miami Marlins. However, they immediately followed that with a 6–1 homestand against the Nationals and the Detroit Tigers.

June
After coming home from a disappointing West Coast trip that saw the Mets go 2–5 with two blown leads of 4 runs in the 8th inning, the Mets went 4–2 on their homestand against the Giants and Rockies. The Mets then split a day-night doubleheader with the Yankees in the first leg of the 2019 Subway Series. On June 20, the Mets fired pitching coach Dave Eiland and bullpen coach Chuck Hernandez, replacing them with Phil Regan and Ricky Bones respectively.

July
On July 23, Robinson Cano became the third Met to hit three home runs in one home game at Citi Field. The previous two were Kirk Nieuwenhuis and Lucas Duda, who both did so in July 2015; Cano also became the first Met to hit three home runs in any game since Yoenis Cespedes in April 2017. He is also the oldest second baseman in MLB history to hit three home runs in one game.

On July 28, the Mets traded pitching prospects Anthony Kay and Simeon Woods Richardson to the Toronto Blue Jays in exchange for Marcus Stroman.

The Mets finished the month strong, winning each of the last six games of the month.

August
The Mets continued their hot play to begin the month, winning 9 of their first 10 in August, including eight in a row and 15 out of 16 stretching back to July 25—their best 16-game stretch since 1990.

By August 7, the Mets had a record of 19-6 since the All-Star break, the league's best record in that time, and were within one game of a wild-card playoff berth.

On August 18, Pete Alonso hit his 40th home run of the season in an 11–5 win over the Kansas City Royals, setting a new National League record for home runs in a season by a rookie, breaking the previous record of 39 by Cody Bellinger in 2017.

On August 27, Alonso hit his 42nd home run of the season in a 5–2 loss to the Chicago Cubs, setting a new record for home runs in a season by a New York Mets player.  This is also the first time any MLB rookie has set a franchise record for home runs in a season since Johnny Rizzo did so for the Pittsburgh Pirates in 1938.

The Mets' wild card chances took a hit after back-to-back series sweeps against the Atlanta Braves and Chicago Cubs, but the team closed out the month with two consecutive wins against the Philadelphia Phillies.

August saw the continued improvement of the Mets bullpen, which had struggled prior to the All-Star break, but had a 3.79 ERA in the second half of the season as of the end of August, ranking fifth in the major leagues.

September
Mets catcher Wilson Ramos had a career-best 26-game hitting streak through September 4. It was tied with David Wright in 2006–07 for the second-longest streak in Mets history, was the longest ever for a Mets catcher, and was the longest in the MLB since Freddie Freeman's 30-game streak for the Atlanta Braves in 2016.

The Mets suffered a historic loss on September 3, surrendering a 6-run lead in the bottom of the ninth inning against the Washington Nationals in an 11–10 loss. The Mets had a projected 99.7% chance of winning heading into the bottom of the ninth, and before the loss, MLB teams in 2019 leading by six runs of more in the ninth inning had a perfect 274–0 record, and the Mets had an 806–0 franchise record when leading by six or more in the ninth. Edwin Díaz allowed a three-run walk-off home run in the game. As of September 6, Díaz had allowed 14 ninth-inning home runs in 2019, tying Francisco Rodriguez of the Milwaukee Brewers in 2014 for the most allowed in a season in MLB history. The Mets had allowed 31 total ninth-inning home runs in 2019 as of September 6, the most by any team in league history.

On September 18, with Alonso's 49th home run of the season, the team broke their single-season franchise record for home runs, surpassing the 224 hit by the 2017 team.

Similar to their collapse in 2007 and collapse in 2008, the Mets lost a critical game to the Miami Marlins, then known as the Florida Marlins. As the Nationals and Brewers both won on September 23, the Mets fell behind 6–0 to the 54-101 Marlins and lost 8–4, making one Brewers win enough to eliminate them from playoff contention.

Despite beating the Marlins 10–3 on September 25, the Mets were eliminated from the playoffs that day due to the Brewers beating the Reds to clinch a wild card.

On September 27, Alonso hit his 52nd home run of the season off of Braves pitcher Dallas Keuchel, tying Aaron Judge's rookie record set in 2017. The next night, Alonso broke the record, hitting his 53rd home run off of Mike Foltynewicz.

The Mets finished the season in 3rd place at 86–76, 11 games behind the Braves and 3 games behind the Milwaukee Brewers for the second wild card spot. The Mets went 46-26 after the All-Star Break, which was the second-best record in the National League behind only the Los Angeles Dodgers (46-24).

Season standings

National League East

National League Division Leaders

Record vs. opponents

Roster

Game log

|-style=background:#bfb;"
|1|| March 28||@ Nationals || 2–0 || deGrom (1–0) || Scherzer (0–1) || Díaz (1) || Nationals Park || 42,263 || 1–0
|-style=background:#bfb;"
|2 || March 30||@ Nationals || 11–8 || Wilson (1–0) || Rosenthal (0–1)  || Díaz (2) || Nationals Park || 33,765 || 2–0
|-style=background:#fbb;"
|3 || March 31||@ Nationals || 5–6 || Doolittle (1–0) || Wilson (1–1) || — || Nationals Park || 23,430 || 2–1
|-

|-style=background:#bfb
|4 || April 1 ||@ Marlins || 7–3 || Familia (1–0) || Steckenrider (0–1) || — || Marlins Park || 6,489 || 3–1
|-style=background:#bfb
|5 || April 2 ||@ Marlins || 6–5 || Vargas (1–0) || Ureña (0–2) || Wilson (1) || Marlins Park || 5,934 || 4–1
|-style=background:#bfb
|6 || April 3 ||@ Marlins || 6–4 || deGrom (2–0) || Richards (0–1) || Díaz (3) || Marlins Park || 7,486 || 5–1
|-style=background:#fbb;
|7 || April 4 ||Nationals || 0–4 || Strasburg (1–0)  || Syndergaard (0–1) || — || Citi Field || 44,424 || 5–2
|-style=background:#bfb
|8 || April 6 ||Nationals || 6–5 || Familia (2–0)  || Sipp (0–1) || Díaz (4) || Citi Field || 35,156 || 6–2
|-style=background:#fbb;
|9 || April 7 ||Nationals || 9–12 || Scherzer (1–2)  || Wheeler (0–1) || — || Citi Field || 40,681 || 6–3
|-style=background:#fbb
|10 || April 9 ||Twins || 8–14 || Hildenberger (2–0) || deGrom (2–1) || — || Citi Field || 22,126 || 6–4
|-style=background:#bfb
|11 || April 10||Twins || 9–6 || Syndergaard (1–1) || Odorizzi (0–2) || — || Citi Field || 20,946 || 7–4
|-style=background:#bfb
|12|| April 11||@ Braves || 6–3 || Matz (1–0) || Gausman (1–1) || Díaz (5)|| SunTrust Park || 24,015 || 8–4
|-style=background:#bfb
|13|| April 12||@ Braves || 6–2 || Wheeler (1–1) || Wright (0–2) || — || SunTrust Park || 33,334 || 9–4
|-style=background:#fbb
|14|| April 13||@ Braves || 7–11 || Toussaint (1–0) || Oswalt (0–1) || — || SunTrust Park || 40,117 || 9–5
|-style=background:#fbb
|15|| April 14||@ Braves || 3–7 || Teherán (2–1) || deGrom (2–2) || — || SunTrust Park || 23,385 || 9–6
|-style=background:#bfb
|16|| April 15||@ Phillies || 7–6  || Avilán (1–0) || Neshek (0–1) || Díaz (6) || Citizens Bank Park || 32,423 || 10–6
|-style=background:#fbb
|17|| April 16||@ Phillies || 3–14 || Pivetta (2–1) || Matz (1–1) || Eickhoff (1) || Citizens Bank Park || 43,933 || 10–7
|-style=background:#fbb
|18|| April 17||@ Phillies || 2–3 || Arrieta (3–1) || Wheeler (1–2) || Neris (2) || Citizens Bank Park || 39,861 || 10–8
|-style=background:#bfb
|19|| April 19||@ Cardinals || 5–4 || Lugo (1–0) || Wainwright (1–2) || Díaz (7) || Busch Stadium || 40,413 || 11–8
|-style=background:#fbb
|20|| April 20||@ Cardinals || 2–10 || Mikolas (2–1)|| Flexen (0–1) || — || Busch Stadium || 47,059 || 11–9
|-style=background:#fbb
|21|| April 21||@ Cardinals || 4–6 || Hudson (1–1) || Syndergaard (1–2) || Hicks (5) || Busch Stadium || 42,765 || 11–10
|-style=background:#bfb
|22|| April 22||Phillies || 5–1 || Matz (2–1) || Arrieta (3–2) || — || Citi Field || 25,293 || 12–10
|-style=background:#bfb
|23|| April 23||Phillies || 9–0 || Wheeler (2–2) || Eflin (2–3) || — || Citi Field || 26,049 || 13–10
|-style=background:#fbb
|24|| April 24||Phillies || 0–6 || Valasquez (1–0) || Vargas (1–1) || — || Citi Field || 27,685 || 13–11
|-style=background:#fbb
|25|| April 26||Brewers || 2–10 || Albers (2–1) || deGrom (2–3) || — || Citi Field || 28,131 || 13–12
|-style=background:#fbb
|26|| April 27||Brewers || 6–8 || Woodruff (3–1) || Syndergaard (1–3) || Hader (6) || Citi Field || 40,610 || 13–13
|-style=background:#bfb
|27|| April 28||Brewers || 5–2 || Matz (3–1)|| Barnes (1–1) || Díaz (8) || Citi Field || 25,756 || 14–13
|-style=background:#fbb
|28|| April 29||Reds || 4–5 || Iglesias (1–3) || Díaz (0–1) || — || Citi Field || 20,766 || 14–14
|-style=background:#bfb
|29|| April 30||Reds || 5–4  || Gagnon (1–0) || Iglesias (1–4) || — || Citi Field|| 20,836 || 15–14
|-

|-style=background:#fbb
|30|| May 1 ||Reds || 0–1 || Duke (2–1) || Díaz (0–2) || Lorenzen (2) || Citi Field|| 22,119 || 15–15
|-style=background:#bfb
|31|| May 2 ||Reds || 1–0 || Syndergaard (2–3) || Mahle (0–4) || — || Citi Field|| 21,445 || 16–15
|-style=background:#fbb
|32|| May 3 ||@ Brewers || 1–3 || Woodruff (4–1) || Matz (3–2) || Hader (8) || Miller Park || 32,550 || 16–16
|-style=background:#fbb
|33|| May 4 ||@ Brewers || 3–4  || Williams (1–1) || Flexen (0–2) || — || Miller Park || 39,565 || 16–17
|-style=background:#fbb
|34|| May 5 ||@ Brewers || 2–3 || Davies (4–0) || Vargas (1–2) || Hader (9) || Miller Park || 36,016 || 16–18
|-style=background:#fbb
|35|| May 6 ||@ Padres || 0–4 || Paddack (3–1) || deGrom (2–4) || Stammen (1) || Petco Park || 20,176 || 16–19
|-style=background:#bfb
|36|| May 7 ||@ Padres || 7–6 || Lugo (2–0) || Warren (2–1) || Díaz (9) || Petco Park || 23,129 || 17–19
|-style=background:#fbb
|37|| May 8 ||@ Padres || 2–3 || Reyes (2–0) || Bashlor (0–1) || Yates (15)|| Petco Park || 21,952 || 17–20
|-style=background:#bfb
|38|| May 10||Marlins || 11–2 || Wheeler (3–2) || López (2–5) || — || Citi Field|| 25,194 || 18–20
|-style=background:#bfb
|39|| May 11|| Marlins || 4–2 || deGrom (3–4) || Alcántara (1–4) || Díaz (10) || Citi Field|| 32,501 || 19–20
|-style=background:#bbb
| — || May 12 || Marlins || colspan=7 | Postponed (inclement weather: rain). Makeup date: August 5th
|-style=background:#bfb
|40|| May 14||@ Nationals || 6–2 || Syndergaard (3–3) || Hellickson (2–2) || — || Nationals Park || 23,315 || 20–20
|-style=background:#fbb
|41|| May 15||@ Nationals || 1–5 || Corbin (4–1) || Font (1–1) || — || Nationals Park || 29,673 || 20–21
|-style=background:#fbb
|42|| May 16||@ Nationals || 6–7 || Jennings (1–2) || Wheeler (3–3) || Doolittle (7) || Nationals Park || 28,807 || 20–22
|-style=background:#fbb
|43|| May 17||@ Marlins || 6–8 || Richards (1–5) || deGrom (3–5) || Romo (7) || Marlins Park || 9,870 || 20–23
|-style=background:#fbb
|44|| May 18||@ Marlins || 0–2 || López (3–5) || Matz (3–3) || Conley (2) || Marlins Park || 13,474 || 20–24
|-style=background:#fbb
|45|| May 19||@ Marlins || 0–3 || Alcántara (2–4) || Syndergaard (3–4) || — || Marlins Park || 15,983 || 20–25
|-style=background:#bfb
|46|| May 20||Nationals || 5–3 || Gagnon (2–0) || Corbin (4–2) || Díaz (11) || Citi Field || 22,335 || 21–25
|-style=background:#bfb
|47|| May 21||Nationals || 6–5 || Díaz (1–2) || Rainey (0–1) || — || Citi Field|| 24,631 || 22–25
|-style=background:#bfb
|48|| May 22||Nationals || 6–1 || Gagnon (3–0) || Barraclough  (0–1) || — || Citi Field|| 27,188 || 23–25
|-style=background:#bfb
|49|| May 23||Nationals || 6–4 || Gsellman (1–0) || Suero (1–4) || Díaz (12) || Citi Field|| 29,962 || 24–25
|-style=background:#fbb
|50|| May 24||Tigers || 8–9 || Farmer (3–3) || Gagnon (3–1) || Greene (16) || Citi Field|| 27,082 || 24–26
|-style=background:#bfb
|51|| May 25||Tigers || 5–4  || Santiago (4–5) || Farmer (3–4) || — || Citi Field|| 40,691 || 25–26
|-style=background:#bfb
|52|| May 26||Tigers || 4–3 || Wheeler (4–3) || Turnbull (2–4) || Díaz (13) || Citi Field|| 31,414 || 26–26
|-style=background:#fbb
|53|| May 27||@ Dodgers || 5–9 || Kershaw (5–0) || Bashlor (0–2) || Jansen (15) || Dodger Stadium || 47,816 || 26–27
|-style=background:#bfb
|54|| May 28||@ Dodgers || 7–3 || Matz (4-3) || Garcia (0-2) || — || Dodger Stadium || 45,713 || 27-27
|-style=background:#fbb
|55|| May 29||@ Dodgers || 8–9 || Alexander (3–1) || Díaz (1–3) || || Dodger Stadium || 40,559 || 27–28
|-style=background:#fbb
|56|| May 30||@ Dodgers || 0–2 || Ryu (8-1) || Vargas (1-3) || Jansen (16) || Dodger Stadium || 47,848 || 27–29
|-style=background:#bfb
|57|| May 31||@ Diamondbacks || 5–4 || Wheeler (5–3) || Andriese (3–4) || Gsellman (1) || Chase Field || 24,664 || 28–29
|-

|-style=background:#fbb
|58|| June 1 ||@ Diamondbacks || 5–6  || Hirano (2–3) || Bashlor (0–3) || || Chase Field || 34,888 || 28–30
|-style=background:#fbb
|59|| June 2 ||@ Diamondbacks || 1–7 || Kelly (5–6) || Matz (4–4) || — || Chase Field || 26,945 || 28–31
|-style=background:#fbb
|60|| June 4 ||Giants || 3–9 || Melancon (2–0) || Gsellman (1–1) || — || Citi Field|| 24,878 || 28–32
|-style=background:#bfb
|61|| June 5 ||Giants || 7–0 || Vargas (2–3) || Beede (0–2) || — || Citi Field|| 23,357 || 29–32
|-style=background:#bfb
|62|| June 6 ||Giants || 7–3 || Lugo (3–0) || Melancon (2–1) || — || Citi Field|| 28,857 || 30–32
|-style=background:#fbb
|63|| June 7 ||Rockies || 1–5 || Senzatela (5–4) || deGrom (3–6) || — || Citi Field|| 27,520 || 30–33
|-style=background:#bfb
|64|| June 8 ||Rockies || 5–3 || Matz (5–4) || Gray (5–5) || Díaz (14) || Citi Field|| 29,077 || 31–33
|-style=background:#bfb
|65|| June 9 ||Rockies || 6–1 || Syndergaard (4–4) || Hoffman (1–3) || — || Citi Field|| 29,531 || 32–33
|-style=background:#bbb
|—|| June 10||@ Yankees || colspan=7 | Postponed (inclement weather: rain). Makeup date: June 11 (doubleheader)
|-style=background:#fbb
|66|| June 11||@ Yankees || 5–12 || Tanaka (4–5) || Wheeler (5–4) || — || Yankee Stadium || 41,538 || 32–34
|-style=background:#bfb
|67|| June 11||@ Yankees || 10–4 || Vargas (3–3) || Paxton (3–3) || — || Yankee Stadium || 44,698 || 33–34
|-style=background:#bbb
|68|| June 13||Cardinals || colspan=7 | Suspended (inclement weather: rain). Continuation date: June 14 (doubleheader)
|-style=background:#fbb
|68|| June 14||Cardinals || 4–5  || Martínez (1–0) || Díaz (1–4) || Hicks (14) || Citi Field|| 31,862 || 33–35
|-style=background:#fbb
|69|| June 14||Cardinals || 5–9 || Gant (6–0) || Familia (2–1) || — || Citi Field|| 28,560 || 33–36
|-style=background:#bfb
|70|| June 15||Cardinals || 8–7 || Syndergaard (5–4) || Wacha (4–3) || Díaz (15) || Citi Field|| 32,589 || 34–36
|-style=background:#fbb
|71|| June 16||Cardinals || 3–4 || Miller (3–2) || Flexen (0–3) || Martínez (2) || Citi Field|| 37,054 || 34–37
|-style=background:#fbb
|72|| June 17||@ Braves || 3–12 || Soroka (8–1) || Wheeler (5–5) || — || SunTrust Park || 24,660 || 34–38
|-style=background:#bfb
|73|| June 18||@ Braves || 10–2 || deGrom (4–6) || Teherán (5–5) || — || SunTrust Park || 24,791 || 35–38
|-style=background:#fbb
|74|| June 19||@ Braves || 2–7 || Fried (8–3) || Matz (5–5) || — || SunTrust Park || 37,104 || 35–39
|-style=background:#fbb
|75|| June 20||@ Cubs || 4–7 || Alzolay (1–0) || Lockett (0–1) || Cishek (7) || Wrigley Field || 38,956 || 35–40
|-style=background:#bfb
|76|| June 21||@ Cubs || 5–4 || Pounders (1–0) || Brach (3–2) || Díaz (16) || Wrigley Field || 41,078 || 36–40
|-style=background:#bfb
|77|| June 22||@ Cubs || 10–2 || Wheeler (6–5) || Quintana (4–7) || — || Wrigley Field || 41,106 || 37–40
|-style=background:#fbb
|78|| June 23||@ Cubs || 3–5 || Cishek (2–4) || Lugo (3–1) || Strop (9) || Wrigley Field || 39,077 || 37–41
|-style=background:#fbb
|79|| June 24||@ Phillies || 7–13 || Eflin (7–7) || Matz (5–6) || — || Citizens Bank Park || 29,117 || 37–42
|-style=background:#fbb
|80|| June 25||@ Phillies || 5–7 || Arrieta (7–6) || Font (1–2) || Neris (16) || Citizens Bank Park || 28,125 || 37–43
|-style=background:#fbb
|81|| June 26||@ Phillies || 4–5  || García (2–0) || Nogosek (0–1) || — || Citizens Bank Park || 29,822 || 37–44
|-style=background:#fbb
|82|| June 27||@ Phillies || 3–6 || Hammer (1–0) || Díaz (1–5) || — || Citizens Bank Park || 39,161 || 37–45
|-style=background:#fbb
|83|| June 28||Braves || 2–6 || Soroka (9–1) || deGrom (4–7) || — || Citi Field|| 36,421 || 37–46
|-style=background:#fbb
|84|| June 29||Braves || 4–5 || Newcomb (2–0) || Lugo (3–2) || Jackson (13) || Citi Field|| 40,809 || 37–47
|-style=background:#bfb
|85|| June 30||Braves || 8–5 || Font (2–2) || Newcomb (2–1) || Díaz (17) || Citi Field|| 31,743 || 38–47
|-

|-style=background:#bfb
|86 || July 2 ||Yankees || 4–2 || Lugo (4–2) || Ottavino (3–3) || Díaz (18) || Citi Field|| 42,150 || 39–47
|-style=background:#fbb
|87 || July 3 ||Yankees || 1–5 || Germán (10–2) || Vargas (3–4) || — || Citi Field|| 43,323 || 39–48
|-style=background:#fbb
|88 || July 5 ||Phillies || 2–7 || Morgan (3–3) || Díaz (1–6) || — || Citi Field|| 32,546 || 39–49
|-style=background:#bfb
|89 || July 6 ||Phillies || 6–5 || Syndergaard (6–4) || Arrieta (8–7) ||  Díaz (19) || Citi Field|| 31,350 || 40–49
|-style=background:#fbb
|90 || July 7 ||Phillies || 3–8 || Nola (8–2) || Wheeler (6–6) || — || Citi Field|| 34,247 || 40–50
|-style=background:#bff
|colspan="10"|90th All-Star Game in Cleveland, Ohio
|-style=background:#fbb
|91 || July 12||@ Marlins || 4–8 || Smith (5–4) || Vargas (3–5) || — || Marlins Park || 11,856 || 40–51
|-style=background:#bfb
|92 || July 13||@ Marlins || 4–2 || Syndergaard (7–4) || Anderson (2–4) || Díaz (20) || Marlins Park || 12,963 || 41–51
|-style=background:#bfb
|93 || July 14||@ Marlins || 6–2 || deGrom (5–7) || Alcántara (4–9) || — || Marlins Park || 14,780 || 42–51
|-style=background:#bfb
|94 || July 16||@ Twins || 3–2 || Avilán (2–0) || Pineda (6–5) || Díaz (21) || Target Field || 28,712 || 43–51
|-style=background:#bfb
|95 || July 17||@ Twins || 14–4 || Vargas (4–5) || May (3–3) || — || Target Field || 35,124 || 44–51
|-style=background:#fbb
|96 || July 18||@ Giants || 2–3  || Jerez (1–0) || Mazza (0–1) || — || Oracle Park || 36,862 || 44–52
|-style=background:#fbb
|97 || July 19||@ Giants || 0–1  || Dyson (4–1) || Rhame (0–1) || — || Oracle Park || 32,861 || 44–53
|-style=background:#bfb
|98 || July 20||@ Giants || 11–4 || Lockett (1–1) || Samardzija (7–8) || — || Oracle Park || 33,860 || 45–53
|-style=background:#fbb
|99 || July 21||@ Giants || 2–3  || Gott (6–0) || Gsellman (1–2) || — || Oracle Park || 35,406 || 45–54
|-style=background:#bfb
|100|| July 23||Padres || 5–2 || Vargas (5–5) || Paddack (6–5) || Díaz (22) || Citi Field|| 33,199 || 46–54
|-style=background:#fbb
|101|| July 24||Padres || 2–7 || Strahm (4–7) || Syndergaard (7–5) || — || Citi Field|| 32,252 || 46–55
|-style=background:#bfb
|102|| July 25||Padres || 4–0 || deGrom (6–7) || Lauer (5–8) || — || Citi Field|| 37,822 || 47–55
|-style=background:#bfb
|103|| July 26||Pirates || 6–3 || Wheeler (7–6) || Agrazal (2–1) || Lugo (1) || Citi Field|| 33,776 || 48–55
|-style=background:#bfb
|104|| July 27||Pirates || 3–0 || Matz (6–6) || Williams (3–4) || || Citi Field|| 39,944 || 49–55
|-style=background:#bfb
|105|| July 28||Pirates || 8–7 || Vargas (6–5) || Archer (3–8) || Díaz (23) || Citi Field|| 32,976 || 50–55
|-style=background:#bfb
|106|| July 30||@ White Sox || 5–2  || Gsellman (2–2) || Ruiz (1–2) || — || Guaranteed Rate Field || 15,947 || 51–55
|-style=background:#bfb
|107|| July 31||@ White Sox || 4–2 || Wilson (2–1) || Colomé (3–2) ||  Díaz (24) || Guaranteed Rate Field || 25,812 || 52–55
|-

|-style=background:#bfb
|108|| August 1 ||@ White Sox || 4–0 || Wheeler (8–6) || Cease (1–4) || — || Guaranteed Rate Field || 23,477 || 53–55
|-style=background:#fbb
|109|| August 2 ||@ Pirates || 4–8 || Williams (4–4) || Matz (6–7) || — || PNC Park || 24,311 || 53–56
|-style=background:#bfb
|110|| August 3 ||@ Pirates || 7–5 || Wilson (3–1) || Crick (3–6) || — || PNC Park || 37,335 || 54–56
|-style=background:#bfb
|111|| August 4 ||@ Pirates || 13–2 || Syndergaard (8–5) || Musgrove (8–10) || — || PNC Park || 22,716 || 55–56
|-style=background:#bfb
|112|| August 5 ||Marlins || 6–2 || deGrom (7–7) || Dugger (0–1) || — || Citi Field|| N/A || 56–56
|-style=background:#bfb
|113|| August 5 ||Marlins || 5–4 || Familia (3–1) || Brigham (1–1) || Lugo (2) || Citi Field|| 29,645 || 57–56
|-style=background:#bfb
|114|| August 6 ||Marlins || 5–0 || Wheeler (9–6) || Noesí (0–1) || — || Citi Field|| 27,479 || 58–56
|-style=background:#bfb
|115|| August 7 ||Marlins || 7–2 || Matz (7–7) || Yamamoto (4–3) || — || Citi Field|| 26,349 || 59–56
|-style=background:#bfb
|116|| August 9 ||Nationals || 7–6 || Avilán (3–0) || Doolittle (6–4) || — || Citi Field|| 39,602 || 60–56
|-style=background:#bfb
|117|| August 10||Nationals || 4–3 || Lugo (5–2) || Rodney (0–5) || — || Citi Field|| 43,875 || 61–56
|-style=background:#fbb
|118|| August 11||Nationals || 4–7 || Grace (1–2) || Gsellman (2–3) || Doolittle (26) || Citi Field|| 41,000 || 61–57
|-style=background:#fbb
|119|| August 13||@ Braves || 3–5 || Fried (14–4) || Wheeler (9–7) || Melancon (2) || SunTrust Park || 27,627 || 61–58
|-style=background:#fbb
|120|| August 14||@ Braves || 4–6 || Martin (1–3) || Lugo (5–3) || Blevins (1) || SunTrust Park || 23,582 || 61–59
|-style=background:#bfb
|121|| August 15||@ Braves || 10–8 || Stroman (7–11) || Teherán (7–8) || Díaz (25) || SunTrust Park || 25,424 || 62–59
|-style=background:#fbb
|122|| August 16||@ Royals || 1–4 || Montgomery (3–5) || Syndergaard (8–6) || Kennedy (21) || Kauffman Stadium || 21,439 || 62–60
|-style=background:#bfb
|123|| August 17||@ Royals || 4–1 || deGrom (8–7) || Junis (8–11) || Lugo (3) || Kauffman Stadium || 28,697 || 63–60
|-style=background:#bfb
|124|| August 18||@ Royals || 11–5 || Familia (4–1) || McCarthy (2–2) || — || Kauffman Stadium || 20,661 || 64–60
|-style=background:#bfb
|125|| August 20||Indians || 9–2 || Matz (8–7) || Bieber (12–6) || — || Citi Field|| 33,800 || 65–60
|-style=background:#bfb
|126|| August 21||Indians || 4–3  || Avilán (4–0) || Hand (6–4) || — || Citi Field|| 28,349 || 66–60
|-style=background:#bfb
|127|| August 22||Indians || 2–0  || Syndergaard (9–6) || Civale (1–3) || Sewald (1) || Citi Field|| 30,998 || 67–60
|-style=background:#fbb
|128|| August 23||Braves || 1–2  || Jackson (7–2) || Familia (4–2) || Melancon (5) || Citi Field|| 31,437 || 67–61
|-style=background:#fbb
|129|| August 24||Braves || 5–9 || Tomlin (2–1) || Brach (4–4) || — || Citi Field|| 38,300 || 67–62
|-style=background:#fbb
|130|| August 25||Braves || 1–2 || Keuchel (5–5) || Matz (8–8) || Melancon (6) || Citi Field|| 30,170 || 67–63
|-style=background:#fbb
|131|| August 27||Cubs || 2–5 || Darvish (5–6) || Stroman (7–12) || — || Citi Field|| 34,158 || 67–64
|-style=background:#fbb
|132|| August 28||Cubs || 7–10 || Ryan (4–2) || Syndergaard (9–7) || Kimbrel (12) || Citi Field|| 33,987 || 67–65
|-style=background:#fbb
|133|| August 29||Cubs || 1–4 || Lester (11–9) || deGrom (8–8) || Kimbrel (13) || Citi Field|| 38,389 || 67–66
|-style=background:#bfb
|134|| August 30||@ Phillies || 11–5 || Wilson (4–1) || Morin (1–1) || — || Citizens Bank Park || 30,503 || 68–66
|-style=background:#bfb
|135|| August 31||@ Phillies || 6–3 || Matz (9–8) || Vargas (6–7) || Lugo (4) || Citizens Bank Park || 40,690 || 69–66
|-

|-style=background:#fbb
|136|| September 1 ||@ Phillies || 2–5 || Neris (3–5) || Zamora (0–1) || — || Citizens Bank Park || 33,492 || 69–67
|-style=background:#bfb
|137|| September 2 ||@ Nationals || 7–3 || Syndergaard (10–7) || Ross (3–4) || — || Nationals Park || 25,329 || 70–67
|-style=background:#fbb
|138|| September 3 ||@ Nationals || 10–11 || Guerra (3–1) || Díaz (1–7) || — || Nationals Park || 20,759 || 70–68
|-style=background:#bfb
|139|| September 4 ||@ Nationals || 8–4 || Wheeler (10–7) || Sánchez (8–7) || — || Nationals Park || 20,237 || 71–68
|-style=background:#bfb
|140|| September 6 ||Phillies || 5–4 || Díaz (2–7) || Morin (1–2) || — || Citi Field|| 28,107 || 72–68
|-style=background:#fbb
|141|| September 7 ||Phillies || 0–5 || Smyly (4–6) || Stroman (7–13) || — || Citi Field|| 28,848 || 72–69
|-style=background:#fbb
|142|| September 8 ||Phillies || 7–10 || Suárez (5–1) || Sewald (0–1) || Neris (24) || Citi Field|| 30,264 || 72–70
|-style=background:#bfb
|143|| September 9 ||Diamondbacks || 3–1 || deGrom (9–8) || Kelly (10–14) ||  Lugo (5) || Citi Field|| 21,337 || 73–70
|-style=background:#bfb
|144|| September 10||Diamondbacks || 3–2 || Wheeler (11–7) || Gallen (3–5) || Wilson (2) || Citi Field|| 20,843 || 74–70 
|-style=background:#bfb
|145|| September 11||Diamondbacks || 9–0 || Matz (10–8) || Ray (12–8) || — || Citi Field|| 21,841 || 75–70
|-style=background:#bfb
|146|| September 12||Diamondbacks || 11–1 || Stroman (8–13) || Young (7–4) || — || Citi Field|| 21,856 || 76–70
|-style=background:#fbb
|147|| September 13||Dodgers || 2–9 || Kershaw (14–5) || Syndergaard (10–8) || — || Citi Field|| 36,097 || 76–71
|-style=background:#bfb
|148|| September 14||Dodgers || 3–0 || Lugo (6–3) || Kelly (5–4) || Wilson (3) || Citi Field|| 39,264 || 77–71
|-style=background:#fbb
|149|| September 15||Dodgers || 2–3 || Jansen (5–3) || Lugo (6–4)  || Maeda (2) || Citi Field|| 31,521 || 77–72
|-style=background:#fbb
|150|| September 16||@ Rockies || 4–9 || Senzatela (10–10) || Matz (10–9) || — || Coors Field || 28,505 || 77–73
|-style=background:#bfb
|151|| September 17||@ Rockies || 6–1 || Stroman (9–13) || Melville (2–3) || — || Coors Field || 33,118 || 78–73
|-style=background:#bfb
|152|| September 18||@ Rockies || 7–4 || Lugo (7–4) || Díaz (5–4) || — || Coors Field || 30,174 || 79–73
|-style=background:#bfb
|153|| September 20||@ Reds || 8–1 || deGrom (10–8) || Castillo (15–7) || — || Great American Ball Park || 20,576 || 80–73
|-style=background:#fbb
|154|| September 21||@ Reds || 2–3 || Kuhnel (1–0) || Wilson (4–2) || Iglesias (34) || Great American Ball Park || 30,487 || 80–74
|-style=background:#bfb
|155|| September 22||@ Reds || 6–3 || Brach (5–4) || Bauer (11–13) || Wilson (4) || Great American Ball Park || 21,335 || 81–74
|-style=background:#fbb
|156|| September 23||Marlins || 4–8 || Smith (10–10) || Matz (10–10) || — || Citi Field|| 21,189 || 81–75
|-style=background:#bfb
|157|| September 24||Marlins || 5–4  || Sewald (1–1) || Conley (2–10) || — || Citi Field|| 21,766 || 82–75
|-style=background:#bfb
|158|| September 25||Marlins || 10–3 || deGrom (11–8) || Dugger (0–4) || — || Citi Field|| 21,471 || 83–75
|-style=background:#fbb
|159|| September 26||Marlins || 2–4 || Brigham (3–2) || Wheeler (11–8) || Ureña (3) || Citi Field|| 21,729 ||  83–76
|-style=background:#bfb
|160|| September 27||Braves || 4–2 || Stroman (10–13) || Keuchel (8–8) || Lugo (6) || Citi Field|| 26,264 || 84–76
|-style=background:#bfb
|161|| September 28||Braves || 3–0 || Matz (11–10) || Foltynewicz (8–6) || Díaz (26) || Citi Field|| 32,210 || 85–76
|-style=background:#bfb
|162|| September 29||Braves || 7–6  || Mazza (1–1) || Dayton (0–1) || — || Citi Field|| 31,523 || 86–76
|-

Player stats 

Note: Team batting and pitching leaders in each category are in bold.

Batting

Starters by position 
Note: Pos = Position; G = Games played; AB = At bats; H = Hits; Avg. = Batting average; HR = Home runs; RBI = Runs batted in; OPS = OBP + SLG (On base + slugging percentage)

Other batters 
Note: Pos = Position; G = Games played; AB = At bats; H = Hits; Avg. = Batting average; HR = Home runs; RBI = Runs batted in; OPS = OBP + SLG (On base + slugging percentage)

Pitching

Starting  and other pitchers
Note: W = Wins; L = Losses; ERA = Earned run average; G = Games pitched; GS = Games started; IP = Innings pitched; SO = Strikeouts; WHIP = Walks and hits per inning pitched

Relief pitchers
Note: W = Wins; L = Losses; ERA = Earned run average; G = Games pitched; GF = Games finished; SV = Saves; IP = Innings pitched; SO = Strikeouts; WHIP = Walks and hits per inning pitched

Farm system

References

External links
2019 New York Mets season Official Site
2019 New York Mets season at Baseball Reference

New York Mets seasons
New York Mets season
New York Mets
2010s in Queens
Flushing, Queens